Scopula griseolineata is a moth of the  family Geometridae. It is found in New Guinea.

Taxonomy
Scopula griseolineata is a junior secondary homonym of Sterrha griseolineata described by Warren in 1900 and requires a replacement name.

References

Moths described in 1915
griseolineata
Moths of New Guinea